Ludwig Feuchtwanger (28 November 1885, Munich - 14 July 1947, Winchester, England) was a German lawyer, lecturer and author.

Life 
Feuchtwanger's ancestors originated from the Middle Franconian city of Feuchtwangen which, following a pogrom in 1555, expelled all its resident Jews. Some of the expellees subsequently settled in Fürth where they were called the Feuchtwangers, meaning those from Feuchtwangen. Feuchtwanger's grandfather Elkan moved to Munich in the middle of 19th century.

Ludwig Feuchtwanger was born in 1885 to Orthodox Jewish margarine manufacturer Sigmund Feuchtwanger and his wife Johanna née Bodenheim. He was the second son in a family of nine siblings. He was the younger brother of Lion Feuchtwanger, a German-Jewish novelist and playwright. He and his brother Martin became authors.

Ludwig lived in a home on Grillparzer Strasse, and was a neighbor of Adolf Hitler. After Kristallnacht in 1938, following brief incarceration in Dachau, Ludwig escaped to England. His son is the London-based historian Edgar Feuchtwanger. Two of his sisters settled in Palestine following the rise of the Nazi Party, one was killed in a concentration camp, and one sister settled in New York City.

Published works 
Briefwechsel 1918 - 1935 - Published by Duncker & Humblot (September 30, 2007)

References

External links
Guide to the Ludwig Feuchtwanger Collection at the Leo Baeck Institute, New York.

1885 births
1947 deaths
People from Munich
People from the Kingdom of Bavaria
20th-century German lawyers
Writers from Bavaria

Jewish emigrants from Nazi Germany to the United Kingdom
German male writers
Jewish writers